State Route 57 (SR-57) is a state highway in Emery County in the U.S. state of Utah.

Route description
SR-57 begins at the junction with SR-10 near the Hunter Power Plant, three miles (5 km) southwest of Castle Dale, and runs almost straight north for almost four miles (6 km) until it nears Orangeville. It then bypasses Orangeville heading northwest.

History
The road from SR-29 at Orangeville Junction south through Orangeville (along Main Street) to SR-10 was added to the state highway system in 1927 as a spur of SR-29, and in 1931 it was split off as SR-57. In 1978, the Utah Transportation Commission adopted a realignment onto a bypass of Orangeville, with a new northern terminus on SR-29 at the county road to the Wilberg Mine. An interchange was built at the new SR-29 junction in 1978, and said county road became an extension of SR-57 in 1982.

Major intersections

References

057
 057